Michio Kaku (born January 24, 1947) is an American theoretical physicist, futurist, and popularizer of science (science communicator). He is a professor of theoretical physics in the City College of New York and CUNY Graduate Center. Kaku is the author of several books about physics and related topics and has made frequent appearances on radio, television, and film. He is also a regular contributor to his own blog, as well as other popular media outlets. For his efforts to bridge science and science fiction, he is a 2021 Sir Arthur Clarke Lifetime Achievement Awardee.

His books Physics of the Impossible (2008), Physics of the Future (2011), The Future of the Mind (2014), and The God Equation: The Quest for a Theory of Everything (2021) became New York Times best sellers. Kaku has hosted several television specials for the BBC, the Discovery Channel, the History Channel, and the Science Channel.

Early life
Kaku was born in San Jose, California, to second-generation Japanese-American parents. Reflecting on his childhood, he said that his grandfather had come to the United States to do the cleanup operation after the 1906 San Francisco earthquake, and his father and mother were both born in California; his father in Palo Alto and his mother in Marysville. Both his parents were interned in the Tule Lake War Relocation Center during World War II, where they met and where his elder brother was born.

Kaku was inspired to pursue a career in physics after seeing a photograph of Albert Einstein's desk at the time of his death. Kaku was fascinated to learn that Einstein had been unable to complete his unified field theory and resolved to dedicate his life to solving this theory. By the time Kaku was in high school, he had developed a strong passion for physics. For a science fair, Michio built a 2.3 MeV “atom smasher” in his parents' garage. Using scrap metal and 22 miles of wire, he created a magnetic field 20,000 times stronger than Earth’s, as well as collisions powerful enough to produce antimatter.  It was at this National Science Fair in Albuquerque, New Mexico, that he attracted the attention of physicist Edward Teller, who took Kaku as a protégé, awarding him the Hertz Engineering Scholarship. Kaku graduated summa cum laude from Harvard University in 1968 and was first in his physics class. He attended the Berkeley Radiation Laboratory at the University of California, Berkeley, receiving a PhD and holding a lectureship at Princeton University in 1972. 

In 1968, during the Vietnam War, Kaku, who was about to be drafted, joined the United States Army, remaining until 1970. He completed his basic training at Fort Benning, Georgia, and advanced infantry training at Fort Lewis, Washington. However, he was never deployed to Vietnam.

Academic career

As part of the research program in 1975 and 1977 at the department of physics at the City College of the City University of New York, Kaku worked on research on quantum mechanics. He was a Visitor and Member (1973 and 1990)  at the Institute for Advanced Study in Princeton and New York University.  As of 2014, he holds the Henry Semat Chair and Professorship in theoretical physics at the City College of New York.

Between 1970 and 2000, Kaku had papers published in physics journals covering topics such as superstring theory, supergravity, supersymmetry, and hadronic physics. In 1974, Kaku and Prof. Keiji Kikkawa of Osaka University co-authored the first papers describing string theory in a field form.

Kaku is the author of several textbooks on string theory and quantum field theory. An explicit description of the second-quantization of the light-cone string was given by Kaku and Keiji Kikkawa.

Popular science
Kaku is most widely known as a popularizer of science and physics outreach specialist. He has written books and appeared on many television programs as well as film. He also hosts a weekly radio program.

Books
Kaku is the author of various popular science books:

Beyond Einstein: The Cosmic Quest for the Theory of the Universe (with Jennifer Thompson) (1987)
Hyperspace: A Scientific Odyssey through Parallel Universes, Time Warps, and the Tenth Dimension (1994)
Visions: How Science Will Revolutionize the 21st Century  (1997)
Einstein's Cosmos: How Albert Einstein's Vision Transformed Our Understanding of Space and Time (2004)
Parallel Worlds: A Journey through Creation, Higher Dimensions, and the Future of the Cosmos (2004)
Physics of the Impossible: A Scientific Exploration into the World of Phasers, Force Fields, Teleportation, and Time Travel (2008)
Physics of the Future: How Science Will Shape Human Destiny and Our Daily Lives by the Year 2100 (2011)
 The Future of the Mind: The Scientific Quest to Understand, Enhance, and Empower the Mind (2014)
 The Future of Humanity: Terraforming Mars, Interstellar Travel, Immortality, and Our Destiny Beyond Earth (2018)  
 The God Equation: The Quest for a Theory of Everything (2021)  

Hyperspace was a bestseller and voted one of the best science books of the year by The New York Times and The Washington Post. Parallel Worlds was a finalist for the Samuel Johnson Prize for nonfiction in the UK.

Radio

Kaku is the host of the weekly one-hour radio program Exploration, produced by the Pacifica Foundation's WBAI in New York. Exploration is syndicated to community and independent radio stations and makes previous broadcasts available on the program's website. Kaku defines the show as dealing with the general topics of science, war, peace, and the environment.

In April 2006, Kaku began broadcasting Science Fantastic on 90 commercial radio stations in the United States. It is syndicated by Talk Radio Network and now reaches 130 radio stations and America's Talk on XM and remains the only nationally syndicated science radio program. Featured guests include Nobel laureates and top researchers in the fields of string theory, time travel, black holes, gene therapy, aging, space travel, artificial intelligence, and SETI. When Kaku is busy filming for television, Science Fantastic goes on hiatus, sometimes for several months. Kaku is also a frequent guest on many programs, where he is outspoken in all areas and issues he considers of importance, such as the program Coast to Coast AM where, on November 30, 2007, he reaffirmed his belief that the existence of extraterrestrial life is a certainty. During the debut of Art Bell's new radio show Dark Matter on September 16, 2013, Bell referred to Kaku as "the next Carl Sagan", referring to Kaku's similar ability to explain complex science so anyone can understand it.

Kaku has appeared on many mainstream talk shows, discussing popular fiction such as Back to the Future, Lost, and the theories behind the time travel these and other fictional entertainment focus on.

On 25 July 2021 Kaku was a guest on BBC Radio 3's Private Passions.

Television and film
Kaku has appeared in many forms of media and on many programs and networks, including Good Morning America, The Screen Savers, Larry King Live, 60 Minutes, Imus In The Morning, Nightline, 20/20, Naked Science, CNN, ABC News, CBS News, NBC News, Al Jazeera English, Fox News Channel, The History Channel, Conan, The Science Channel, The Discovery Channel, TLC, Countdown with Keith Olbermann, The Colbert Report, The Art Bell Show and its successor, Coast to Coast AM, BBC World News America, The Covino & Rich Show, Head Rush, Late Show with David Letterman, the Joe Rogan Experience,  and Real Time with Bill Maher. He was interviewed for two PBS documentaries, The Path to Nuclear Fission: The Story of Lise Meitner and Otto Hahn and Out from the Shadows: The Story of Irène Joliot-Curie and Frédéric Joliot-Curie, which were produced and directed by his former WBAI radio colleague Rosemarie Reed.

In 1999, Kaku was one of the scientists profiled in the feature-length film Me & Isaac Newton, directed by Michael Apted. It played theatrically in the United States, later was broadcast on national television, and won several film awards.

In 2005, Kaku appeared in the short documentary film Obsessed & Scientific about the possibility of time travel and the people who dream about it. It was screened at the Montreal World Film Festival and a feature film expansion was in proposed. Kaku also appeared in the ABC documentary UFOs: Seeing Is Believing, in which he suggested that while he believes it is extremely unlikely that extraterrestrials have ever visited Earth, we must keep our minds open to the possible existence of civilizations a million years ahead of us in technology, where entirely new avenues of physics open up. He also discussed the future of interstellar exploration and alien life in the Discovery Channel special Alien Planet as one of the multiple speakers who co-hosted the show.

In February 2006, Kaku appeared as presenter in the BBC-TV four-part documentary Time which seeks to explore the mysterious nature of time. Part one of the series concerns personal time, and how we perceive and measure the passing of time. The second in the series deals with cheating time, exploring possibilities of extending the lifespan of organisms. The geological time covered in part three explores the ages of the Earth and the Sun. Part four covers the topics of cosmological time, the beginning of time and the events that occurred at the instant of the big bang.

On January 28, 2007, Kaku hosted the Discovery Channel series 2057. This three-hour program discussed how medicine, cities, and energy could change over the next 50 years.

In 2008, Kaku hosted the three-hour BBC-TV documentary Visions of the Future, on the future of computers, medicine, and quantum physics, and he appeared in several episodes of the History Channel's Universe and Ancient Aliens series.

On December 1, 2009, he began hosting a 12-episode weekly television series for the Science Channel at 10 pm, called Sci Fi Science: Physics of the Impossible, based on his bestselling book. Each 30-minute episode discusses the scientific basis behind imaginative schemes, such as time travel, parallel universes, warp drive, star ships, light sabers, force fields, teleportation, invisibility, death stars, and even superpowers and flying saucers. Each episode includes interviews with the world's top scientists working on prototypes of these technologies, interviews with science fiction fans as well as showing clips from science fiction movies and discussing that special effects and computer graphics were used to create them. Although these inventions are impossible today, the series discusses when these technologies might become feasible in the future.

In 2010, he began to appear in a series on the website Gametrailers.com entitled Science of Games, discussing the scientific aspects of various popular video games such as Mass Effect 2 and Star Wars: The Force Unleashed.

Kaku's popularity in American culture can largely be attributed to his charismatic way of explaining complex scientific theories in layman's terms. While his technical writings are confined to theoretical physics, his public speaking and media appearances cover a broad range of topics, from the Kardashev scale to more esoteric subjects such as wormholes and time travel. In January 2007, Kaku visited Oman. While there, he talked at length to select members of that country's decision makers. In an interview with local media, Kaku elaborated on his vision of the future of humans. Kaku considers climate change and terrorism as serious threats in human evolution from a Type 0 civilization to Type 1 on the Kardashev scale.

He is featured in Symphony of Science's songs, "The Quantum World", "Our Place in the Cosmos", "The Secret of the Stars", and "Monsters of the Cosmos".

On October 11, 2010, Kaku appeared in the BBC program "What Happened Before the Big Bang" (along with Laura Mersini-Houghton, Andrei Linde, Roger Penrose, Lee Smolin, Neil Turok, and other notable cosmologists and physicists), where he discussed his theory of the universe created out of nothing.

Over January 22 to 25, 2011, Kaku was invited to the fifth annual Global Competitiveness Forum (GCF), held in Riyadh, Saudi Arabia, along with renowned specialists including the British journalist Nick Pope, the Canadian ufologist Stanton Friedman, and the French astrophysicist Jacques Vallée.

Kaku appears on the DVD and Blu-ray extras of the 2012 version of Total Recall, discussing the technological aspects of the future explored in the film.

Web series
In 2018, Kaku hosted the web series Next World with Michio Kaku on CuriosityStream.

Policy advocacy and activism

Kaku has publicly stated his concerns over matters including people denying the anthropogenic cause of global warming, nuclear armament, nuclear power, and what he believes to be the general misuse of science. Conscious of the possibility of casualties if the probe's fuel were dispersed into the environment during a malfunction and crash as the probe was making a "sling-shot" maneuver around Earth, Kaku publicly criticized NASA's risk assessment. He has spoken on the dangers of space junk and called for more and better monitoring. Kaku is generally a vigorous supporter of the exploration of space, believing that the ultimate destiny of the human race may lie in extrasolar planets, but he is critical of some of the cost-ineffective missions and methods of NASA.

Kaku credits his anti-nuclear war position to information he learned via programs he heard on the Pacifica Radio network during his student years in California. It was during this period that he made the decision to turn away from a career developing the next generation of nuclear weapons in association with his mentor, Edward Teller, and instead focused on research, teaching, writing, and accepting media opportunities to educate. Kaku joined with others such as Helen Caldicott, Jonathan Schell, and those associated with Peace Action, which was instrumental in building a global anti-nuclear weapons movement that arose in the 1980s during the administration of U.S. President Ronald Reagan.

Kaku was a board member of Peace Action and of radio station WBAI-FM in New York City, where he originated his long-running program, Exploration, that focuses on the issues of science, war, peace, and the environment.

His remark from an interview in support of SETI, "We could be in the middle of an intergalactic conversation... and we wouldn't even know", is used in the third Symphony of Science installment "Our Place in the Cosmos". Kaku is also a member of the CuriosityStream advisory board.

Personal life
Kaku is married to Shizue Kaku. They have  two daughters, Alyson and Michelle.

In popular culture
In 2001, the British rock band Muse released their Origin of Symmetry album. The theme and name of the album is based on Kaku's book Hyperspace.

Works

Kaku, Michio (2021). The God Equation: The Quest for a Theory of Everything. New York: Doubleday.  .

Filmography

 We Are the Guinea Pigs (1980)
 Borders (1989)
 Synthetic Pleasures (1995)
 Einstein Revealed (1996)
 Future Fantastic (1996)
 Stephen Hawking's Universe (1997)
 Bioperfection: Building a New Human Race (1998)
 Me & Isaac Newton (1999)
 Space: The Final Junkyard (1999)
 Ghosts: Caught on Tape (2000)
 Big Questions (2001)
 Parallel Universes (2001)
 Horizon: "Time travel" (2003)
 Robo Sapiens (2003)
 Brilliant Minds: Secret Of The Cosmos (2003)
 Nova: "The Elegant Universe" (2003)
 Hawking (2004)
 The Screen Savers (2004)
 Unscrewed with Martin Sargent (2004)
 Alien Planet (2005)
 ABC News "UFOs: Seeing Is Believing" (2005)
 HARDtalk Extra (2005)
 Last Days on Earth (2005)
 Obsessed & Scientific (2005)
 Horizon: "Einstein's Unfinished Symphony" (2005)
 Exodus Earth (2006)
 Time (2006)
 2057 (2007)
 The Universe (2007)
 Futurecar (2007)
 Attack of the Show! (2007)
 Visions of the Future (2008)
 Horizon: "The President's Guide to Science" (2008)
 Stephen Hawking: Master of the Universe (2008)
 Horizon: "Who's Afraid of a Big Black Hole" (2009–2010)
 Sci Fi Science: Physics of the Impossible (2009–2010)
 Horizon: "What Happened Before the Big Bang?" (2010)
 GameTrailers TV With Geoff Keighley: "The Science of Games" (2010)
 How the Universe Works (2010-2014)
 Seeing Black Holes (2010)
 Prophets of Science Fiction (2011)
 Through the Wormhole (2011)
 Horizon: "What Happened Before the Big Bang?" (2011)
 The Science of Doctor Who (2012)
 Horizon: "The Hunt for Higgs" (2012)
 The Principle: "The Principle" (2014)
 Deep Time History (2016)
 Year Million: "Year Million" (2017)
 Life 2.0 (2020)
 Meltdown: Three Mile Island (2022)

See also

 Michio Kaku official website
Anti-nuclear movement in the United States
List of peace activists
Carl Sagan
String field theory
Fusion
Kardashev scale

References

External links

 
 

Science Fantastic (Jun–Aug 2013) at Talk Radio Network (TRN)

1947 births
Living people
20th-century American non-fiction writers
20th-century American physicists
21st-century American non-fiction writers
21st-century American physicists
Activists from California
American academics of Japanese descent
American anti–nuclear power activists
American anti–nuclear weapons activists
American male non-fiction writers
American radio personalities
American science writers
American transhumanists
American writers of Japanese descent
City College of New York faculty
City University of New York faculty
Futurologists
Harvard University alumni
Japanese-American civil rights activists
Life extensionists
Fellows of the American Physical Society
Pacifica Foundation people
Princeton University faculty
Science communicators
American social commentators
Space advocates
Theoretical historians
American string theorists
United States Army soldiers
University of California, Berkeley alumni
Writers from San Jose, California
20th-century American male writers
21st-century American male writers